The Zhymyky is a river in the Ulytau District, Karaganda Region, Kazakhstan.

The river flows across the road that runs roughly from east to west between Koskol and Karsakpay.

Course
The Zhymyky has its origin in the southwestern slopes of the Ulutau Range, to the west of the Lakbay wintering settlement. It heads roughly westwards and northwestwards within a deep, steep channel. In its final stretch the river bends and flows roughly southwestwards, bending southwards near the end and flowing into the northeastern shores of the Shubarteniz lake.

The Zhymyky is fed by winter snows and during the yearly spring floods its water is fresh. The waters of the river are used for watering livestock.

See also
List of rivers of Kazakhstan

References

External links
Сердце Казахстана — Улытау (in Russian)
Пресс-релиз — Аральское море (in Russian)
Туристско-научная экспедиция - Казахстанская правда (in Russian)
История Улытау (in Russian)

Rivers of Kazakhstan
Karaganda Region
Shalkarteniz basin